Kyzylorda Region is a region of Kazakhstan. Its capital is the city of Kyzylorda, with a population of 234 736. The region itself has a population of 823 251. Other notable settlements include Aral, Kazaly (Kazalinsk) and the Russian-administered Baikonur, which services the Baikonur Cosmodrome.

Geography
The Kyzylorda Region shares a border with the neighboring country of Uzbekistan. It is bound as well by three other regions of Kazakhstan: Aktobe Region to the west, Karaganda Region to the north and Turkistan Region to the east.
The Lesser Barsuki and Aral Karakum deserts are located in the region. The main lakes are Zhaksykylysh, Kamyslybas and Arys. The Syr Darya River, flowing from the Tian Shan mountains to the Aral Sea, passes through Kyzylorda Region.

Demographics
As of 2020, the Kyzylorda Region has a population of 803,531.

Ethnic groups (2020):
Kazakh: 96.33%
Russian: 1.80%
Korean: 0.91%
Others: 0.96%

Administrative divisions
The region is administratively divided into seven districts and the city of Kyzylorda.
 Aral District, with the administrative center in the town of Aral;
 Karmakshy District, the settlement of Zhosaly;
 Kazaly District, the urban-type settlement of Ayteke Bi;
 Shieli District, the urban-type settlement of Shieli;
 Syrdariya District, the urban-type settlement of Terenozek;
 Zhalagash District, the urban-type settlement of Zhalagash;
 Zhanakorgan District, the urban-type settlement of Zhanakorgan.

Three localities in Kyzylorda Region have town status. These are Aral, Kazaly, and Kyzylorda. The city of Baikonur is located within the area of the oblast but is currently rented and administered by Russian Federation.

Sport
The region sent a bandy team to the Spartakiade 2009.

Economy 
In 2021, Kazakh Industry and Infrastructure Development Minister Beibut Atamkulov announced that the country plans to launch glass production in the Kyzylorda region in 2022. The aim is to produce a capacity of 197,100 tons of flat glass each year, with a projection of generating KZT 42.1 billion.

See also
Barsa-Kelmes Nature Reserve

References

External links
Official regional administration website

 
1938 establishments in the Soviet Union
Recipients of the Order of Lenin
Regions of Kazakhstan
States and territories established in 1938